Sir Colin Hamilton Allan  (23 October 1921 – 5 March 1993) was a New Zealander who spent most of his professional life in the British administration of their overseas territories. He was the last Governor of the Solomon Islands from 1976 to 1978, prior to their independence.

Early life
Allan was born in Wellington on 23 October 1921. He was the son of John Calder Allan and Mabel Eastwood.

He was educated at the Cambridge Primary School and Hamilton High School. He obtained a Bachelor of Arts degree from Canterbury University College in 1943 and then graduated Master of Arts in 1945. He also obtained a Diploma in Anthropology from Magdalene College, Cambridge.

During World War II he was a naval officer in Wellington in 1942, transferred to the New Zealand Signals the same year and was in the Army Education Service until 1944 where he held the rank of lance corporal. In 1945 he was posted to the British Solomon Islands Protectorate Defence Force where he served as a lieutenant until 1946.

He married Betty Evans in 1955. They had three sons: Timothy, Johnathan, Christopher.

Colonial service
Towards the end of the Second World War the British Colonial Service had a vast number of vacancies in its 50 dependent territories around the world. Restoration of basic civilian administration was a priority for the Service, particularly in those countries that had been invaded. Because of the shortage of suitable staff, the Service appointed some colonials, including Allan.

Solomon Islands
The post-war period was a particularly difficult one for the Service, with various independence movements springing up around the globe. In the British Solomon Islands Protectorate where Allan was appointed as Administrative Officer (Cadet) in 1945, the Marching Rule was one such movement.

He was appointed as District Officer on Nggela (1945), Western Solomons (1946), Ysabel and Choiseul (1948), and Malaita in 1949. From 1947 to 1948 he was District Commissioner for Western Solomons. He became District Commissioner for Malaita in 1952. From 1953 to 1954 he was Special Lands Commissioner. By 1954 Allan had organised the first Council of Malaita for the local population. This effectively ended the influence of the Marching Rule.

Western Pacific High Commission
From 1954 to 1955 Allan was attached to the Western Pacific High Commission's Secretariat (Finance and Development). He became Senior Assistant Secretary in 1955. Appointed to the Special Lands Commission from 1956 to 1957, member and Secretary BSIP Agriculture and Industry Loans Board (1956–1957), Secretary for Protectorate Affairs (1957–1958), Chairman BSIP Copra Marketing Board (1957–1958), and UK member of the South Pacific Commission Research Council (1958).

In 1957 he wrote a book called Customary Land Tenure in the British Solomon Islands Protectorate in which he outlined the native land ownership.

Vanuatu
Allan was Assistant British Resident Commissioner to the New Hebrides (now Vanuatu) from 1959 to 1966 and British Resident Commissioner from 1966 to 1973. Allan's residence was on Iririki by Port Vila.

Seychelles
In 1973 Allan was appointed Governor of the Seychelles, a post he held until 1 October 1975 when he was appointed High Commissioner from 1 October 1975 to 28 June 1976, when the Seychelles became an independent republic.

Return to the Solomons
Allan was appointed Governor of the Solomon Islands from 1976 to 1978. His appointment ended when the Solomons gained their independence in 1978.

Retirement
When he retired the Australian National University and the Universities of Auckland, Otago and New South Wales all invited him as a visiting lecturer or fellow.

Allan was awarded the OBE in 1959, the CMG in 1968, and KCMG in 1977. He was also awarded the French Commander l'Ordre National du Mérite.

He died on 5 March 1993 at Howick, New Zealand.

Publications
Solomons safari 1953–58, Christchurch, Nag's Head Press (1990)

References

External links
Sir Colin Allan Papers via Pacific Manuscripts Bureau

1921 births
1993 deaths
Governors of British Seychelles
New Zealand Knights Commander of the Order of St Michael and St George
New Zealand Officers of the Order of the British Empire
University of Canterbury alumni
Alumni of Magdalene College, Cambridge
20th-century New Zealand non-fiction writers
People educated at Hamilton High School
Governors of the Solomon Islands
People from Wellington City
Resident Commissioners of the New Hebrides (United Kingdom)
Royal New Zealand Navy personnel of World War II
New Zealand military personnel of World War II
New Zealand expatriates in England
New Zealand expatriates in the Solomon Islands
New Zealand expatriates in Vanuatu
Expatriates in Seychelles